Beth Tzedec Memorial Park is a Jewish cemetery on Bathurst Street in Toronto, Ontario, Canada.

Established in 1949 by the Beth Tzedec Congregation, the cemetery is located next to Park Lawn Cemetery, Westminster Memorial Park and G. Ross Lord Reservoir.

Notable burials
 David Croll – Senator, federal MP, Ontario MLA/MPP, Mayor of Windsor, Ontario
 Philip Givens – Mayor of Toronto, federal MP and judge
 Allan Grossman – Ontario MPP and cabinet minister
 Larry Grossman – Ontario MPP and cabinet minister, Progressive Conservative Party leader; son of Allan Grossman
 Bob Kaplan – MP and federal cabinet minister
 Cec Linder – actor, played "Felix Leiter" in the James Bond film Goldfinger
 Jack Rabinovitch – philanthropist, businessman and founder of Giller Prize
 Goodwin "Goody" Rosen – businessman, minor and later major league All Star baseball player with Brooklyn Dodgers and New York Giants

See also
 Beth Tzedec Congregation
 Jones Avenue Cemetery
 Dawes Road Cemetery
 Pape Avenue Cemetery

References

External links
 Beth Tzedec Memorial Park – Steeles Memorial Chapel
 

Jewish cemeteries in Toronto
Jews and Judaism in Toronto
1949 establishments in Canada